This is an episode list for Sabrina the Teenage Witch, an American sitcom that debuted on ABC in 1996. From Season 5, the program was aired on The WB. The series ran for seven seasons totaling 163 episodes. It originally premiered on September 27, 1996 on ABC and ended on April 24, 2003 on The WB.

Series overview

Episodes

Season 1 (1996–1997)
In the first season, Sabrina Spellman discovers on her 16th birthday that she is a witch. With the help of her witch aunts, Hilda and Zelda, and their talking cat Salem, Sabrina learns to master her powers. Sabrina's school life is dominated by her budding romance with Harvey Kinkle, her relationship with friend Jenny Kelly and teacher Mr. Pool and her rivalry with villainous cheerleader Libby Chessler, who battles with Sabrina for Harvey's affections.

Season 2 (1997–1998)
In the second season, Sabrina must study to earn her witch's license. Her school life is made difficult not only by her ongoing rivalry with Libby, but also by new vice principal Mr. Kraft, who dislikes Sabrina and dates Hilda. Sabrina also has a "quizmaster" who tests her in preparation for her license, and befriends a new girl named Valerie and Mrs. Quick, a neurotic math teacher.

Season 3 (1998–1999)
In the third season, Sabrina finally gets her witch's license, but before she can use it, she must solve the Spellman family secret. Throughout the season, some of Sabrina's witch relatives visit and leave clues for Sabrina. Sabrina solves the family secret at the end of the season. At school, Mr. Kraft and Libby continue to make her life miserable, and Mr. Kraft starts dating Zelda, making Hilda jealous.

Season 4 (1999–2000)
In Season 4, Sabrina finally turns 18 and Libby has been sent off to boarding school. Harvey's best friend Brad Alcerro enrolls at Westbridge High, and is hostile towards Sabrina because he possesses a rare witch-hunting gene. Mr. Kraft is made principal, and Sabrina's best friend Valerie, who was to spend her senior year living with Sabrina and her aunts, goes to stay with her family in Alaska. Sabrina mentors a young witch named Dreama. She also gets a part-time job at a coffee shop, but she soon finds herself falling for her boss Josh, putting her relationship with Harvey in jeopardy. In the season finale, Harvey discovers that Sabrina is a witch. Zelda dates Mr. Kraft until the season's penultimate episode when she breaks off their relationship. Hilda buys a clock shop with a magical "Lost in Time" clock in the back room.

Season 5 (2000–2001)
As Season 5 begins, Sabrina is about to start college, but she has spent the summer trying to get over her breakup with Harvey. After seeing an Other Realm therapist, Sabrina moves out of her aunts' home, much to the dismay of Hilda and Zelda. However, they still find ways to remain close to Sabrina: Zelda takes a teaching job at Sabrina's college, while Hilda, whose clock shop has gone out of business, buys the coffee shop where Sabrina works. Sabrina moves into a dormitory and bonds with roommates Roxie, Morgan and Miles. Sabrina has several boyfriends during this season, but does not get together with Josh until the season finale. Harvey only appears in a few episodes in brief appearances, but he apologizes to Sabrina for his reaction upon learning that she was a witch.

Season 6 (2001–2002)
In Season 6, Sabrina and Josh are dating. Harvey returns and begins dating Morgan, although he still cares for Sabrina. College life continues for Sabrina and her friends. In the season finale, Hilda gets married, but the season ends with a cliffhanger when Sabrina literally goes to pieces after Harvey tells her that he is moving to California and Josh says that he is accepting a newspaper job in Prague.

Season 7 (2002–2003)
Season 7 began airing on The WB on September 20, 2002 and concluded on April 24, 2003. The regular cast underwent several changes most notably that Caroline Rhea and Beth Broderick did not return as regular cast members, the first season without them as part of the main cast, though Rhea did make a guest appearance as Hilda in the series finale "Soul Mates." David Lascher as Josh Blackhart and Trevor Lissauer as Miles Goodman also did not return as part of the main cast. Four new main cast members joined: Diana-Maria Riva as Annie Martos, Andrew Walker as Cole Harper, Bumper Robinson as James and John Ducey as Leonard. Dylan Neal joined the cast in Episode 13 ("Sabrina in Wonderland") as Sabrina's new crush Aaron Jacobs, the man to whom Sabrina becomes engaged. Melissa Joan Hart's sister Emily Hart returned as Sabrina's cousin for the episode "Bada-Ping!" and the series finale.

At the beginning of the seventh and final season, Sabrina is literally in pieces, but put back together after her Aunt Zelda sacrifices her adult years to save her, turning her body into that of a young child. With Zelda and Hilda gone, Morgan, Roxie and Sabrina move into the old house. Sabrina gets a job as a writer for entertainment magazine Scorch, with rude boss Annie and coworkers Cole, James and Leonard, though this storyline and its characters are put aside in Episode 14 ("Present Perfect") when Sabrina quits. Sabrina then meets Aaron, the man to whom she becomes engaged. Harvey tells Sabrina that he is still in love with her. In the series finale, Sabrina calls off her wedding with Aaron and runs away with Harvey, her soul mate.

TV films

References

General references

External links
 

Lists of American fantasy television series episodes
Lists of American sitcom episodes
Lists of American teen comedy television series episodes
Episodes